Xu Yang may refer to:

Xu Yang (Qing dynasty) (born 1712), court painter to the Qianlong emperor of the Qing dynasty
Xu Yang (high jumper) (born 1970), Chinese high jumper
Xu Yang (speed skater) (born 1977), Chinese female long track speed skater

Footballers
 Surnamed Xu
Xu Yang (footballer, born 1974), former China national football team player, played for Beijing Guoan (2000) and Shandong Luneng (2001–2004)
Xu Yang (footballer, born 1979), Shanghai Shenhua player
Xu Yang (footballer, born 1987), Henan Construction player
 Surnamed Yang
Yang Xu (born 1987), Chinese footballer